Festival Prijateljstva is international multicultural festival, which starts every last Friday in July in the city of Goražde, Bosnia and Herzegovina.

See also
 Culture of Bosnia and Herzegovina

External links
Internacionalni Festival Prijateljstva 2003 (in Bosnian)

Cultural festivals in Bosnia and Herzegovina
Festivals of multiculturalism
Summer events in Bosnia and Herzegovina